Castalia is a village in Erie County, Ohio, United States. The population was 852 at the 2010 census, down from 935 at the 2000 census. It is part of the Sandusky, Ohio Metropolitan Statistical Area.

History
By 1738 there was a Wyandot settlement at what is now Castalia under the leadership of Nicholas Orontony. Due to growing disputes with the French and closer trade relations with Pennsylvania-based merchants, the Wyandot burned their village and relocated to the mouth of the Cuyahoga River in what is today Cleveland in 1748.

Castalia was laid out in 1836. The village was named after Castalia, a figure in Greek mythology.

Geography
Castalia is located in western Erie County at  (41.399805, -82.807176).

Demographics

2010 census
As of the census of 2010, there were 852 people, 352 households, and 239 families residing in the village. The racial makeup of the village was 97.1% White, 0.1% African American, 0.4% Native American, 0.1% Asian, 0.7% from other races, and 1.6% from two or more races. Hispanic or Latino of any race were 3.3% of the population.

There were 352 households, of which 30.4% had children under the age of 18 living with them, 51.4% were married couples living together, 12.2% had a female householder with no husband present, 4.3% had a male householder with no wife present, and 32.1% were non-families. 27.8% of all households were made up of individuals, and 11.6% had someone living alone who was 65 years of age or older. The average household size was 2.42 and the average family size was 2.97.

The median age in the village was 40.5 years. 23.1% of residents were under the age of 18; 7.2% were between the ages of 18 and 24; 26.7% were from 25 to 44; 29.6% were from 45 to 64; and 13.3% were 65 years of age or older. The gender makeup of the village was 49.1% male and 50.9% female.

2000 census
As of the census of 2000, there were 935 people, 359 households, and 266 families residing in the village. The population density was 895.6 people per square mile (347.1/km2). There were 380 housing units at an average density of 364.0 per square mile (141.1/km2). The racial makeup of the village was 97.11% White, 0.96% African American, 0.43% Native American, 0.64% from other races, and 0.86% from two or more races. Hispanic or Latino of any race were 3.32% of the population. 96.8% spoke English and 3.1% Spanish.

There were 359 households, out of which 36.5% had children under the age of 18 living with them, 57.1% were married couples living together, 11.4% had a female householder with no husband present, and 25.9% were non-families. 24.0% of all households were made up of individuals, and 11.4% had someone living alone who was 65 years of age or older. The average household size was 2.60 and the average family size was 3.09.

In the village, the population was spread out, with 27.2% under the age of 18, 7.6% from 18 to 24, 28.7% from 25 to 44, 23.4% from 45 to 64, and 13.2% who were 65 years of age or older. The median age was 37 years. For every 100 females there were 92.0 males. For every 100 females age 18 and over, there were 91.8 males.

The median income for a household in the village was $41,319, and the median income for a family was $51,563. Males had a median income of $36,625 versus $24,783 for females. The per capita income for the village was $17,277. About 4.0% of families and 6.1% of the population were below the poverty line, including 6.3% of those under age 18 and 7.1% of those age 65 or over.

Points of interest

Castalia Pond, otherwise known as the Castalia Duck Pond, is a spring-fed pond that never freezes. Castalia Pond plays host to many birds all year round, but, during winter, especially when Lake Erie freezes, many more waterfowl temporarily take up residence.

The Blue Hole is another spring-fed water feature of Castalia. For many years it was open to the public, but since 1990 it has not been open to visitors.

Castalia is in the Margaretta Township school system. Green and white are the school's colors. The mascot is the polar bear.

Cold Creek Festival is held the third weekend in July on Main Street in Castalia. Some of the activities include the Miss Cold Creek queen's contest, tractor pull, duck drop bingo, men's and women's softball tournament, and many others.

Notable person
 Carrie Chase Davis (1863–1953), physician, suffragist

References

External links
 Castalia Area Historical Society

Villages in Erie County, Ohio
Villages in Ohio
Populated places established in the 1730s
French-American culture in Ohio